An antependium (from Latin ante- and pendēre "to hang before"; pl: antependia), also known as a pulpit fall, parament or hanging, or, when speaking specifically of the hanging for the altar, an altar frontal (Latin: pallium altaris), is a decorative piece, usually of textile, but also metalwork, stone or other material that can adorn a Christian altar.

Specifically, and as the etymology of the word suggests, an antependium hangs down in front of whatever it covers, and is to be distinguished from the altar linens  which are used in the service of the Eucharist, and an altar cloth which covers the top of the altar table (mensa).

Types of antependia

Western Christianity
"Antependium" is the word used for elaborate fixed altar frontals, which, in large churches and especially in the Ottonian art of the Early Medieval period, were sometimes of gold studded with gems, enamels and ivories, and in other periods and churches often carved stone, painted wood panel, stucco, or other materials, such as azulejo tiling in Portugal.

When the front of an altar is elaborately carved or painted, the additional cloth altar frontal normally reaches down only a few inches from the top of the altar table; this is called a "frontlet". In other cases it may reach to the floor (the "frontal", properly so called). In both situations, it will usually cover the entire width of the altar. A "Jacobean frontal" will cover the entire altar, reaching down to the floor on all four sides.

The Anglican Canons of 1603 order that the Lord's Table should be "covered, in time of Divine Service, with a carpet of silk or other decent stuff, thought meet by the Ordinary of the place" (can. 82).

Covers for lecterns and pulpits are generally similar to a frontlet, normally covering the "desk" of the lectern or pulpit and handing down about a foot or longer in front (visible from the congregation).

Eastern Christianity

In the Orthodox Church, the Holy Table (altar) may be covered with one or two coverings. There is always an outer frontal, covering the top of the Holy Table and hanging down several inches on all four sides. This kind is used alone if the front of the Holy Table is elaborately carved or decorated. For a "fully vested" Holy Table, a second, inner hanging is used. This covers the Holy Table fully on the top and hangs down to the floor on all four sides.

The analogia (icon stands) are covered with a covering known as a proskynitarion. As with the coverings used on the Holy Table, there may, again, be only one outer covering or also a second, inner covering that hangs to the floor (though, in this case, sometimes only in the front and back).

Construction
A cloth antependium is normally of the same colour and often of the same fabric and similar style as the vestments worn by the clergy. The fabric may vary from very simple material, such as cotton or wool, to exquisitely wrought damasks, fine watermarked silk, velvet, or satin. Embellishment is commonly by means of decorative bands of material called orphreys, embroidery (sometimes in gold or silver thread, or making use of pearls and semi-precious stones) or appliqués, fringes and tassels, all of a complementary colour to the fabric. The most frequently used symbol on both vestments and hangings is the cross. The antependium is normally lined in satin, using a matching hue.

Colours

The colours used tend to be suggested by the liturgical tradition of each denomination. Most Western Christian churches that observe a developed liturgical tradition use white, gold, red, green, violet and black, with each being used on specified occasions. A rose colour may be employed for the fourth Sunday (Laetare Sunday) in Lent and the third Sunday (Gaudete Sunday) in Advent. In Anglican circles, blue is sometimes prescribed for feasts of the Blessed Virgin Mary (see liturgical colours), although it is also used, unofficially, in some areas of the Roman Catholic Church. Among Eastern Christians, there tend to be two types of vestments: somber (dark) ones and festal (bright) ones. Beyond that, no specific colours are officially required. Among groups such as the Russian Orthodox Church, a pattern of fixed colours has developed, somewhat similar to that used in the West, although they are not, strictly speaking, required.

Other usages
Antependium can also be used to describe the front of the altar itself, especially if it is elaborately carved or gilded. The famous Pala d'Oro in St. Mark's Basilica in Venice originated as an antependium, although it is used as a reredos now.

See also
Altar cloth
Liturgical colours

References

External links
Altar Frontal article from the Catholic Encyclopedia
Orthodox altar with red frontal
Jacobean Frontal St. John's Church, Edinburgh, Scotland

Christian religious objects
Eastern Christian vestments
Altar frontal